The 2018 SEC softball tournament will be held at Mizzou Softball Stadium on the campus of University of Missouri in Columbia, Missouri from May 9 through May 12, 2018. The tournament will earn the Southeastern Conference's automatic bid to the 2018 NCAA Division I softball tournament. The Championship game was broadcast on ESPN2 and the semifinals were broadcast on ESPNU, while all other SEC tournament games will be live on the SEC Network.

Tournament

 Only the top 12 teams are able to participate, therefore, Missouri was not eligible to play.
 Vanderbilt does not sponsor a softball team.

Schedule

See also
 2018 Alabama Crimson Tide softball team
 2018 Auburn Tigers softball team

References

SEC softball tournament
tournament
May 2018 events in the United States
Southeastern Conference softball seasons